Kamenice nad Lipou lies in the northwestern region of the Bohemian-Moravian Highlands, some twenty kilometres north of Jindřichův Hradec, in Pelhřimov District.

The chateau acquired its present Neo-classical appearance in the early 19th century.

In 1580–1583, the original 13th-century castle was converted into a Renaissance mansion graced by a courtyard with arcades and a garden. The Baroque entrance tower was built in 1744. The chateau is surrounded by an English landscape garden featuring a linden tree estimated to be 700–800 years old. Kamenice nad Lipou derives its name from the tree. In 1998, the chateau came under the management of the Museum of Decorative Arts in Prague (UPM). Following extensive restoration work carried out between 1998 and 2004, permanent collections were installed on the ground floor of the Renaissance north wing, where the Museum also holds short-term exhibitions. The south wing of the chateau houses exhibition installations administered by the Municipal Museum, and the Ceremonial Hall. The cellars with their Gothic Hall are also open to visitors.

Permanent exhibitions

Wrought-iron work: grilles, chests, keys, locks, knockers and other ornamental and architectural metalwork dating from the Gothic period to the early 20th century.

Late 19th- and 20th-century toys for boys and girls (from the Collection of František Kyncl).

The Study Collection of 19th- and 20th-century Furniture: The Evolution of Furniture Design in the Bohemian Lands and Other Countries of Europe

A Museum for the Senses: an exhibition of the Municipal Museum that documents the 750-year history of the town of Kamenice nad Lipou in a new, entertaining way.

Short-term exhibitions

For current information concerning short-term exhibitions, see the web pages of the Museum of Decorative Arts in Prague: www.upm.cz

Toys
An annual summer festival of toys, their designers and producers, including art students’ creations and works in the possession of collectors throughout the country and abroad.

See also
Museum of Decorative Arts in Prague
Museum of Textile in Česká Skalice 
Josef Sudek Gallery
The Chateau at Klášterec nad Ohří

External links

 Official site of the Museum of Decorative Arts in Prague

Pelhřimov District
Museums in the Vysočina Region
Art museums and galleries in the Czech Republic
Decorative arts museums
Toy museums
Castles in the Vysočina Region